Antonio Pereira may refer to:

António Pereira (racewalker), Portuguese race walker
Antônio Pereira, Brazilian football referee
António Garcia Pereira, Portuguese lawyer and politician
António Pereira (wrestler), Portuguese wrestler who competed at the 1912 Summer Olympics